Nevada's 2nd Senate district is one of 21 districts in the Nevada Senate. It has been represented by Democrat Mo Denis, the Senate President pro tempore, since 2010.

Geography and demographics
District 2 is based in Las Vegas' Downtown, also covering smaller parts of North Las Vegas and Sunrise Manor in Clark County.

The district overlaps with Nevada's 1st and 4th congressional districts, and with the 11th and 28th districts of the Nevada Assembly.

According to the 2010 census, the district had a population of 128,715 – 0.09% above the ideal. It is the only Senate district in Nevada with a Hispanic/Latino majority, though others have Hispanic pluralities. The population of District 2 is younger than Nevada's average, with over 65% of its inhabitants below the age of 40. The median household income is more than $20,000 lower than average, and 45% of those over 25 don't have a high school diploma. The poverty rate is well over twice as high as in the rest of Nevada. The district also has the lowest percentage of registered voters of any Senate district in Nevada.

Recent election results
Nevada Senators are elected to staggered four-year terms; since 2012 redistricting, the 2nd district has held elections in midterm years.

2018

2014
In 2014, Denis faced off against Independent American Party member Louis Baker, a contractor, auctioneer, and investor; no Republican filed for the seat. Denis, then the Senate Majority Leader, won with over 75% of the vote, the highest margin for any Nevada Senate race in 2014 (excluding uncontested races). After Democrats lost control of the chamber, Denis did not seek re-election as Democratic leader, and was replaced by Aaron D. Ford as Minority Leader.

Federal and statewide results in District 2

History 
The present 2nd district came into existence when the senatorial districts were reapportioned after the 2010 Census. The revised borders went into effect on January 1, 2012 for filing for office, and for nominating and electing senators. They became effective for all other purposes on November 7 of the same year – the day after Election Day, when most senator terms began. In the Nevada Revised Statutes, the area of District 2 is defined using census tracts, block groups, and blocks.

Mo Denis had represented the old 2nd district, which followed similar boundaries but did not include Downtown Las Vegas. Denis continued to represent the newly-drawn district from 2012-2014 despite the new boundaries, and was re-elected in 2014.

References

External links 
 
 

2
Clark County, Nevada